Women of Today was a 1950 British television talk show which aired on the BBC. It was described in the Radio Times as "A series of personal portraits". It was hosted by Jeanne Heal, and ran for about four episodes. It is unlikely that any of the episodes still exist, given the wiping of the era, as well as the fact that the BBC very rarely telerecorded shows prior to the mid-1950s.

References

External links
Women of Today on IMDb

1950s British television series
1950 British television series debuts
1950 British television series endings
Lost BBC episodes
BBC Television shows
Black-and-white British television shows
BBC television talk shows